The Central Arizona Florence Correctional Complex, formerly Central Arizona Detention Center and Florence Correctional Complex, is a privately owned and operated managed prison for men and women located in Florence, Pinal County, Arizona. The facility is run by Corrections Corporation of America and houses prisoners for the United States Marshals Service (USMS), TransCor America LLC, U.S. Immigration and Customs Enforcement (ICE), Pascua Yaqui Tribe, United States Air Force, and City of Mesa. 

The 434,000 square foot facility opened in 1994 and is located on 73 acres of land. The facility has approximately 20 housing units. The U.S. Marshal Service holds the majority of the housing units, U.S. Immigration and Customs Enforcement holds one housing unit, and The City of Mesa is in a shared housing unit. The average population of inmates and detainees is 3,555.

References

Prisons in Arizona
Prison uprisings in the United States
Buildings and structures in Pinal County, Arizona
CoreCivic
Florence, Arizona
1994 establishments in Arizona